"My First Love" is a 1983 song recorded by R&B duo René & Angela on the Capitol label. It was later a hit in 2000 in a cover version by Avant and singer Keke Wyatt.

When originally composed by René Moore and Angela Winbush, they had planned to produce it as a song for Janet Jackson's self-titled debut solo LP but Jackson reportedly turned it down.

Undaunted, the duo recorded the song themselves as a song on their third LP together, Rise. Before "My First Love", their biggest hit up to that point as a recording duo was the 1981 dance single "I Love You More", which peaked at number fourteen on the R&B singles chart.

When released in early 1983, the song gave them their biggest success up to that point reaching number twelve on the R&B chart setting a precedent for the duo's later hit ballads such as "Your Smile" and "You Don't Have to Cry".

Avant's re-recording of the song helped to send the song back to the charts in 2000 reaching number four on the R&B charts and number twenty-six on the pop charts, making it Rene & Angela's most successful recording as songwriters and prompted a brief comeback for Winbush who would take Wyatt's place in singing the song with Avant during a taping of BET's 106 and Park to surprised audience members that year.

Original version credits
All vocals by Rene Moore and Angela Winbush
Keyboards and synthesizers by Rene Moore and Angela Winbush
Produced and written by Rene Moore and Angela Winbush

Avant version credits
All vocals by Avant and Keke Wyatt
Produced by Steve Huff

Sampled version
René & Angela's version of the song has been sampled in Masspike Miles' "Hurt You So Good" featuring Rick Ross. It was produced by Australian hip-hop producer M-Phazes.

All vocals by Miles Wheeler and William Leonard Roberts II
Produced by Mark Landon

References

1983 songs
1983 singles
2000 singles
René & Angela songs
Songs written by René Moore
Songs written by Angela Winbush
Contemporary R&B ballads
1980s ballads